Saillagouse is a commune in the Pyrénées-Orientales department in southern France.

The inhabitants are called Saillagousains.

Geography 
Saillagouse is in the canton of Les Pyrénées catalanes and in the arrondissement of Prades. Saillagouse station has rail connections to Villefranche-de-Conflent and Latour-de-Carol.

Population

See also
Communes of the Pyrénées-Orientales department

References

External links
 Saillagouse site

Communes of Pyrénées-Orientales